The Gap State High School is located in the suburb of The Gap in Brisbane, Queensland, Australia, with a student population of 1,661 in 2020. The Gap State High School is an Education Queensland Secondary High School.

History
The Gap State High School was opened on 25 January 1960, celebrating its 50th anniversary in 2010.

In 2009 the school gained the attention of the media following the suspected stabbing of a student.

In early 2018, the school gained media attention as a number of students were given detention for wearing footwear that didn't comply with the strict uniform guidelines.

Campus
The Gap State High School's Leadership Training Centre opened in August 2002 and features 22 adventure courses including indoor rock climbing and bouldering walls used to develop leadership and communication skills as part of The Gap Outdoor Adventure and Leadership Studies (GOALS) program, which is compulsory for all students. The Leadership Training Centre is open to other schools and the community, and has been used by professional athletes and by the Australian Army for cadet training.  The original teachers working at the centre were trained by a past student of the Gap State High School.

The performing arts centre has an auditorium that can house up to 150 students.

Sporting facilities include one turf cricket pitch, one concrete cricket pitch, two full size soccer fields, four basketball courts, and a new sports hall that houses 4 volleyball courts with digital signage for each court controlled by iPads. This new sporting facility was opened on 21 February 2014 by Premier Campbell Newman.

School facts
 The motto is "Ours The Future" which refers to the work that the school does through the Leadership, Outdoor and Personal Development Programme.
 The uniform and colours are green, white and grey.
 The Assembly Hall, the J A Robertson Hall, is named after the Principal from 1968 to 1982.

Principals 

  Ronald Petty (1959–1963)
  Tom Brady (1965–1967)
  Jack Robertson (1968–1982)
  Bob Rasmussen (1983–1988)
  Bob Guthrie (1989–1999)
  Regan Neumann (20002006)
  Russell Pollock (20062017)
  Anne McLauchlan (2017–present)

Notable alumni
 Arch Bevis
 Andrew Stockdale
 Nikki Boyd
 Emily Hall{founder of card.gift}

References

Learning the ropes at school, Westside News (Brisbane, Queensland, Australia), 12 June 2002, p. 7.
The Gap State High celebrates 40 years of memories, 2000

External links
 The Gap State High School Official website
  The Gap State High Official P & C Site The Gap State High P & C Website

Public high schools in Brisbane
Educational institutions established in 1959
1959 establishments in Australia